Atilio Asuncion Cáceres Báez (born 15 August 1981) is a Paraguayan footballer who plays as a striker.

Career
Cáceres was a youth player at Club Atlético Tembetary and played alongside future Paraguay national team star Nelson Valdez. He furthered his development at Club Sportivo San Lorenzo and afterwards Cerro Porteño PF of the División Intermedia, the second level of the Paraguayan league system. He was then transferred to Real Arroyo Seco in neighbouring Argentina, playing in the Torneo Argentino B, the Argentinean third level.

Cáceres' next move was to Southeast Asia and specifically Brunei, where the only professional club in the country DPMM FC were riding high in the 2006–07 Malaysia Super League. He excelled in trials and was signed by the club in January 2007 along with Alejandro Tobar in the middle of the season, ending the loan stints of Viban Francis Bayong and Dan Ito who were excellent for them in such a short time. These high expectations proved too much for the two to shoulder, as coach Ranko Buketa immediately voiced his dissatisfaction of them in friendly games held days after they signed.

Cáceres made his Super League debut against Negeri Sembilan Naza on 14 February in a 5–1 victory, but suffered a knee injury during the game. His next match would be two weeks later which by then his club had already called up trialists to replace him. He scored his first goal for DPMM against Johor FC in a 3–1 win on 14 March, followed by the winner in a 4–3 victory against league leaders Perak at home on 1 April, ending the opposition's unbeaten streak. Nevertheless, despite scoring two goals in six games, Cáceres was released from his contract in the same month as he was still struggling from the knee injury and moreover he was unpopular with Brunei fans who often prefer workrate over target men strikers, who they deem lazy.

Little is known about Cáceres after his Bruneian adventure, except that he played for Deportivo Caaguazú in their promotion season in the 2009 División Intermedia, possibly being a founding squad member since the club's establishment the year prior. After leaving Deportivo, he moved to Club Sportiva Campo 9 in his local league in his native Eulogio Estigarribia, managing to represent his league in the 2015 Campeonato Nacional de Interligas.

Personal life
Cáceres' elder brother Miguel Ángel is also a footballer who is capped at international level.

References

1981 births
Living people
People from Caaguazú Department
Paraguayan footballers
Association football forwards
Paraguayan expatriate footballers
Atlético Tembetary footballers
Club Sportivo San Lorenzo footballers
Cerro Porteño (Presidente Franco) footballers
Real Arroyo Seco footballers
DPMM FC players
Expatriate footballers in Argentina
Paraguayan expatriate sportspeople in Argentina
Expatriate footballers in Brunei
Paraguayan División Intermedia players
Malaysia Super League players